The 2017 Southland Conference women's soccer tournament was the postseason women's soccer tournament for the Southland Conference held from November 1–5, 2017. The seven-match tournament took place at Jack Dugan Stadium in Corpus Christi, Texas. The eight-team single-elimination tournament consisted of three rounds based on seeding from regular season conference play. The Houston Baptist Huskies were the defending champions, but they were eliminated from the 2017 tournament with a 1–0 quarterfinal loss to the Central Arkansas Sugar Bears. The Lamar Lady Cardinals won the tournament with a 2–0 win over the Stephen F. Austin Ladyjacks in the final. This was the first Southland Conference tournament title for the Lamar women's soccer program and for head coach Steve Holeman.

Bracket

Schedule

Quarterfinals

Semifinals

Final

Statistics

Goalscorers 

2 Goals
 Madison Ledet - Lamar

1 Goal
 Carli Arthurs - Stephen F. Austin
 Hanna Barker - Stephen F. Austin
 Camille Bassett - Central Arkansas
 M.J. Eckart - Lamar
 Carly English - Sam Houston State
 Mari Gillespie - Stephen F. Austin
 Breanna Moore - Stephen F. Austin
 Juliana Ocampo - Lamar
 Juli Rocha - Lamar
 Maci Schoonover - Central Arkansas

All-Tournament team

Source:

MVP in bold

References

External links 
2017 Southland Conference Women's Soccer Championship

 
Southland Conference Women's Soccer Tournament